Freetekno is a cultural movement that is present in Europe, Australia and North America. Freetekno sound systems or tribes form in loose collectives, frequently with anarchist philosophies. These sound systems join to hold parties wherever a viable space can be found – typical locations include warehouses (also known as squat parties), fields, abandoned buildings or forests. Because freetekno parties are usually held illegally this sometimes leads to clashes with the police, as was the case at both the 2004 and 2005 Czechtek festivals and many other, smaller parties around the world at different times.

London in the United Kingdom plays host to "free parties" (term used by the squat party scene) thrown by an array of sound systems every week. A regular theme is (and always has been) techno, although drum & bass, breakbeat, hardcore and psytrance can be common. Parties will occur all over London from derelict/deserted buildings in the borough of Hackney to empty office blocks in the City of London. However, the South West of England is generally considered to have the best free party 'vibe' due to beautiful locations of the raves, as well as the welcoming nature of all those attending. In contrast to London, the music played in the south west is generally drum and bass, jungle, jungletek/raggatek, 4x4 and hardtek.

Music

Tekno or hardtek is also a style of music which takes elements from both techno and hardcore and tends to be very fast and loaded with energy. Speedbass, speedcore and other forms of underground music can be heard at freetekno parties. Freetekno events do not always play spine-crunching, brain melting, ear-drum shattering hardcore (especially the Frenchcore subgenre), though; psychedelic trance, happy hardcore, hardstyle, drum and bass, breakbeats, glitch, electro, world beat, house, techno, trance, and many types of experimental fusion music are also popular at freetekno events.

Organization
There is no central organizing body for freetekno sound systems or parties. It is not a specific group of people, but rather a way of living and partying that ties together diverse individuals. Sound systems start up between friends. Trust and respect are key elements of the scene.

Free tekno parties are likely to attract many sorts of people: ravers, punks, squatters, students. 
In summer, parties are planned which go on for up to one week. All artists are invited to contribute and sometimes up to eighty sound systems attend. These parties are termed teknivals.

The atmosphere is friendly and the party goers police themselves. Racism, sexism and aggression are not tolerated. The freetekno party is a good example of a Temporary Autonomous Zone.

Teknival
Massive parties called teknivals are held across Europe and in Ontario/Quebec every year, many of which attract thousands of people and can last a week or longer. Some feel that teknivals echo prehistoric rituals, and provide an experience greater than the sum of its parts.

History
The freetekno movement appeared in first half of the 1990s in the United Kingdom and in the same decade was strong in Austria, Belgium, the Czech Republic, France, Italy and the Netherlands. It also spread to Canada, Germany, the Pacific Northwest region of the United States, Poland, Slovakia, Spain, Switzerland and Romania.

See also

 Free Tekno  Documentary
 Free party
 Free tekno
 Teknival
 Sound system (DJ)
 List of electronic music festivals

References

External links
 Freetekno.org

Autonomism
Counterculture festivals
Electronic music festivals
Free parties
Music festivals staged internationally
Musical subcultures
Techno